Muhammet Hanifi Yoldaş (born 20 April 1983 in Diest) is a former professional footballer. Born in Belgium, he represented Turkey  at under-21 international level.

References

External links

1983 births
Living people
K.R.C. Genk players
R.A.E.C. Mons players
MKE Ankaragücü footballers
Ankaraspor footballers
Kayserispor footballers
Kardemir Karabükspor footballers
Turkish footballers
Turkey B international footballers
Belgian footballers
Belgian people of Turkish descent
Süper Lig players
Turkey under-21 international footballers
Association football defenders
People from Diest
Footballers from Flemish Brabant